The Neutron Star Interior Composition ExploreR (NICER) is a NASA telescope on the International Space Station, designed and dedicated to the study of the extraordinary gravitational, electromagnetic, and nuclear physics environments embodied by neutron stars, exploring the exotic states of matter where density and pressure are higher than in atomic nuclei. As part of NASA's Explorer program, NICER enabled rotation-resolved spectroscopy of the thermal and non-thermal emissions of neutron stars in the soft X-ray (0.2–12 keV) band with unprecedented sensitivity, probing interior structure, the origins of dynamic phenomena, and the mechanisms that underlie the most powerful cosmic particle accelerators known. NICER achieved these goals by deploying, following the launch, and activation of X-ray timing and spectroscopy instruments. NICER was selected by NASA to proceed to formulation phase in April 2013.

NICER-SEXTANT uses the same instrument to test X-ray timing for positioning and navigation, and MXS is a test of X-ray timing communication. In January 2018, X-ray navigation was demonstrated using NICER on ISS.

Launch 
By May 2015, NICER was on track for a 2016 launch, having passed its critical design review (CDR) and resolved an issue with the power being supplied by the ISS. Following the loss of SpaceX CRS-7 in June 2015, which delayed future missions by several months, NICER was finally launched on 3 June 2017, with the SpaceX CRS-11 ISS resupply mission aboard a Falcon 9 v1.2 launch vehicle.

Science instrument 
NICER's primary science instrument, called the X-ray Timing Instrument (XTI), is an array of 56 X-ray photon detectors. These detectors record the energies of the collected photons as well as with their time of arrival. A Global Positioning System (GPS) receiver enables accurate timing and positioning measurements. X-ray photons can be time-tagged with a precision of less than 300 ns. In August 2022 a fast X-ray follow-up observation program was started with the MAXI instrument named "OHMAN (On-orbit Hookup of MAXI and NICER)" to detect sudden bursts in X-ray phenomena.

During each ISS orbit, NICER will observe two to four targets. Gimbaling and a star tracker allow NICER to track specific targets while collecting science data. In order to achieve its science objectives, NICER will take over 15 million seconds of exposures over an 18-month period.

X-ray navigation and communication experiments 
An enhancement to the NICER mission, the Station Explorer for X-ray Timing and Navigation Technology (SEXTANT), will act as a technology demonstrator for X-ray pulsar-based navigation (XNAV) techniques that may one day be used for deep-space navigation.

XCOM 

As part of NICER testing, a rapid-modulation X-ray device was developed called Modulated X-ray Source (MXS), which is being used to create an X-ray communication system (XCOM) demonstration. If approved and installed on the ISS, XCOM will transmit data encoded into X-ray bursts to the NICER platform, which may lead to the development of technologies that allow for gigabit bandwidth communication throughout the Solar System.  the XCOM test is scheduled for spring 2019. XCOM (inc MXS) was delivered to the ISS in May 2019. Once the test was complete XCOM and the STP-H6 payload malfunctioned in September 2021. It was removed in November 2021 and disposed of on Cygnus NG-16.

Selected results 
In May 2018, NICER discovered an X-ray pulsar in the fastest stellar orbit yet discovered. The pulsar and its companion star were found to orbit each other every 38 minutes.

On 21 August 2019 (UTC; 20 August in the U.S.), NICER spotted the brightest X-ray burst so far observed. It came from the neutron star SAX J1808.4−3658 about 11,000 light-years from Earth in the constellation Sagittarius.

Gallery

See also 

 Explorer program
 Chandra X-ray Observatory, NASA's flagship space observatory for X-rays, in orbit since 1999
 List of X-ray space telescopes
 Scientific research on the International Space Station
 NuSTAR, NASA Explorer-class hard X-ray space observatory, in orbit since 2012
 Rossi X-ray Timing Explorer, an X-ray timing space observatory, active 1995–2012
 X-ray telescope
 XMM-Newton, ESA X-ray space observatory, in orbit since 1999

References

External links 

 NICER website by NASA's Goddard Space Flight Center
 NICER website at nasa.gov
 NICER installation animations and videos

Components of the International Space Station
Explorers Program
International Space Station experiments
Neutron stars
Piggyback mission
Space telescopes
SpaceX payloads contracted by NASA
X-ray telescopes
2017 in spaceflight